Celal Atik (1918 – 27 April 1979) was a Turkish wrestler and coach. He competed both in Greco-Roman and freestyle wrestling, but had his best achievements in the freestyle, winning gold medals at the 1948 Olympics, 1951 World and 1946 and 1949 European championships.

He was born in the village of Gürdan in the Boğazlıyan district of Yozgat Province, Turkey. He changed his family name from "Doğan" to "Atik" (literally, "Slippy") after a proposal by Mustafa Kemal Atatürk, the founder of the Turkish Republic, who noticed his speed at the 1938 national championships.

After retiring from competition, from 1955 to 1979 he coached the national wrestling team and prepared multiple international competitors. Appointed the head trainer by the International Wrestling Federation (FILA) in Switzerland, he gave lessons on wrestling techniques to sportspeople from all around the world.

He is recognized as one of Turkey's best wrestlers, with exceptional technique as well as the most aesthetic physique. In addition to his other honors, he was awarded with the Légion d'honneur of France.

Atik died on 27 April 1979 in a hospital in Ankara. Two sports halls—one in İzmir with a capacity of 1,200 people and another one in his hometown Yozgat—are named after him.

Coaching achievements
 1960 Summer Olympics in Rome, Italy – champion team
 1964 Summer Olympics in Tokyo, Japan – 2 gold, 5 silver and 1 bronze
 1968 Summer Olympics in Mexico City, Mexico – 2 gold
 1955–1971 at all World Championships – various medals

References

External links
 

1918 births
1979 deaths
Olympic wrestlers of Turkey
Wrestlers at the 1948 Summer Olympics
Turkish male sport wrestlers
Olympic gold medalists for Turkey
People from Boğazlıyan
Recipients of the Legion of Honour
Turkish people of Circassian descent
Olympic medalists in wrestling
World Wrestling Championships medalists
Medalists at the 1948 Summer Olympics
European Wrestling Champions
20th-century Turkish people